On Thursday, September 29, 1927, an outbreak of at least 15 significant tornadoes, including three F3 tornadoes, killed at least 82 people in the Central United States, particularly in Missouri and Illinois. The outbreak affected a broad expanse of the Midwestern and Southern United States, including Oklahoma, Missouri, Arkansas, Iowa, Illinois, and Indiana. The deadliest tornado was an estimated F3 which affected portions of Greater St. Louis, killing at least 79 people and injuring at least 550 others. The tornado narrowly missed Downtown St. Louis, striking north of the central business district before crossing the Mississippi River.

Confirmed tornadoes

September 29 event

St. Louis, Missouri–East St. Louis, Illinois

The 1927 St. Louis–East St. Louis tornado was a powerful and devastating tornado that struck St. Louis, Missouri, on Thursday, September 29, 1927, at about 1:00 p.m. local standard time. The tornado is estimated to have reached at least F3 and possible F4 intensity on the Fujita scale. At one time it was the second-costliest tornado in U.S. history. More than 200 city blocks were destroyed. St. Louis University High School was hit hard. The student chapel's roof collapsed, the gym's (now main offices) roof was damaged, an entire classroom caved in on a class, and other classrooms were damaged. All the windows were smashed. Luckily, no one was killed or badly injured. The tornado caused $150,000 in damage to the school.

See also
List of tornadoes and tornado outbreaks
List of North American tornadoes and tornado outbreaks
List of tornadoes striking downtown areas of large cities
1871 St. Louis tornado
1896 St. Louis–East St. Louis tornado
St. Louis tornado outbreak of February 1959
St. Louis tornado history

Notes

References

Sources

 

 

F3 tornadoes
Tornadoes in Missouri
Tornadoes in Illinois
Tornado outbreaks
Tornado 1927-09
Tornado
Tornadoes of 1927